
Gmina Brzostek is an urban-rural gmina (administrative district) in Dębica County, Subcarpathian Voivodeship, in south-eastern Poland. Its seat is the town of Brzostek. (Brzostek gained town status on 1 January 2009 – prior to that the district was classed as a rural gmina.)

The gmina contains part of the protected area called Czarnorzeki-Strzyżów Landscape Park.

Villages
Apart from the town of Brzostek, the gmina contains the villages and settlements of Bączałka, Bukowa, Głobikówka, Gorzejowa, Grudna Dolna, Grudna Górna, Januszkowice, Kamienica Dolna, Kamienica Górna, Klecie, Nawsie Brzosteckie, Opacionka, Przeczyca, Siedliska-Bogusz, Skurowa, Smarżowa, Wola Brzostecka and Zawadka Brzostecka.

Neighbouring gminas
Gmina Brzostek is bordered by the gminas of Brzyska, Dębica, Frysztak, Jodłowa, Kołaczyce, Pilzno, Ropczyce and Wielopole Skrzyńskie.

References
Polish official population figures 2006

Brzostek
Dębica County